Bradley William Shaw (born April 28, 1964) is a Canadian professional ice hockey coach and former player. He is currently an associate coach for the Philadelphia Flyers of the National Hockey League (NHL), and has coached in a variety of roles at various hockey levels.

Junior hockey
Shaw joined the Ottawa 67's of the Ontario Hockey League (OHL) at the age of 17 in 1981-82. In his rookie season, Shaw led all 67's defensemen with 72 points, scoring 13 goals and adding 59 assists in 68 games, helping Ottawa into the playoffs. In 17 playoff games, Shaw scored a goal and 14 points, as the 67's lost to the Kitchener Rangers in the OHL finals.

Shaw saw his offensive production improve in his second season with the 67's in 1982–83 season, scoring 12 goals and 78 points in 63 games. In nine playoff games, Shaw scored two goals and 11 points, as the 67's lost to the Oshawa Generals in the Leyden Division finals.

In 1983–84, Shaw once again improved his offense, scoring 11 goals and 82 points in 68 games, helping the 67's to have the best record in the Leyden Division that season. In the playoffs, Shaw led the 67's in scoring, earning two goals and a team high 29 points in 13 games, as Ottawa won the J. Ross Robertson Cup, and earned a berth in the 1984 Memorial Cup. At the Memorial Cup, Shaw had a goal and five points in five games, as the 67's won the championship, defeating the Kitchener Rangers 7–2 in the final game at the Kitchener Memorial Auditorium. Shaw was named to the 1983–84 OHL first all-star team, and won the Max Kaminsky Trophy, given to the most outstanding defenseman in the OHL.

Professional career

Hartford Whalers
Shaw was originally drafted by the Detroit Red Wings in the fifth round, 86th overall, in the 1982 NHL Entry Draft. His rights were traded to the Hartford Whalers for the Whalers eighth round draft pick in the 1984 NHL Entry Draft on May 29, 1984.

Shaw spent his first professional season splitting time between the Salt Lake Golden Eagles of the International Hockey League (IHL) and the Binghamton Whalers of the American Hockey League (AHL) in 1984-85. In 44 games with the Golden Eagles, Shaw had three goals and 32 points in 44 games. He finished the season with Binghamton, where in 24 games, Shaw had a goal and 11 points.  In eight playoff games with Binghamton, Shaw finished third in team scoring with a goal and nine points in eight games.

He spent the majority of the 1985–86 in Binghamton, where in 64 games, Shaw scored 10 goals and 54 points to lead the defense in scoring. In five playoff games, Shaw earned two assists. Shaw debuted with the Hartford Whalers in the 1985-86 NHL season, appearing in eight games, where he recorded two assists.

In the 1986-87 AHL season, Shaw struggled offensively compared to previous season, as in 77 games with Binghamton, he scored nine goals and 39 points, although, he found his offensive touch in the playoffs, finishing third in team scoring with a goal and nine points in 12 games. Shaw won the Eddie Shore Award as the best defenseman in the AHL. Shaw also appeared in two games with Hartford in 1986-87, earning no points.

Shaw had a solid offensive season with Binghamton in the 1987-88 AHL season, scoring 12 goals and 62 points in 73 games. In four playoff games, Shaw led Binghamton in scoring with five points, all assists. Shaw again saw very limited action with Hartford in 1987–88, going pointless in one game.

Shaw began the 1988-89 season playing with HC Varese in Serie A in Italy, where in 35 games, he scored 10 goals and 40 points. In 11 playoff games, Shaw had four goals and 12 points with Varese.  Shaw returned to the Whalers organization at the end of the 1988-89 NHL season, where he appeared in three games. On March 29, 1989, Shaw scored his first career NHL goal and point against Vincent Riendeau of the St. Louis Blues in a 4–0 Whalers victory, his only point with the Whalers that season. Shaw appeared in three playoff games for the Whalers, and on April 8, 1989, he earned his first career playoff goal and point against Brian Hayward of the Montreal Canadiens in a 5–4 loss.

Shaw had regular ice time with Hartford in 1989–90, appearing in 64 games, scoring three goals and 35 points, and was named to the NHL All-Rookie Team. On October 26, 1989, Shaw recorded four assists in a 7–3 victory against the New Jersey Devils. In the playoffs, Shaw led the Whalers in scoring, earning two goals and seven points in seven games, as the Whalers lost a thrilling first round series against the Boston Bruins. In the third game of the series on April 9, 1990, Shaw scored a goal and added three assists for a four-point game in a 5–3 Hartford win.

In 1990–91, Shaw played in 72 games with Hartford, scoring four goals and 32 points to lead the Whalers defense in scoring. In six playoff games, Shaw recorded a goal and three points, as Hartford lost to the Boston Bruins in the Adams Division semi-finals.

In 62 games with the Whalers in 1991–92, Shaw scored three goals and 25 points to finish second among Whalers defenseman in scoring. Shaw saw action in three playoff games for the club, earning an assist as the Whalers lost to the Montreal Canadiens in the opening playoff round.

On June 13, 1992, the Whalers traded Shaw to the New Jersey Devils for cash. Shaw's stay with the Devils was short-lived, as five days later he was chosen by the Ottawa Senators in the 1992 NHL Expansion Draft.

Ottawa Senators
Shaw joined the Ottawa Senators for their inaugural season in 1992–93, and was named an alternate captain. Shaw played in 81 games with the Senators, scoring seven goals and 41 points to finish second among defensemen on the team.

Shaw was named a co-captain of the Senators with Mark Lamb to begin 1993–94, a position they both held until March when the Senators named Gord Dineen captain, following Lamb's trade to the Flyers. In 66 games, Shaw had four goals and 23 points, which was the highest among Senators defensemen that season.

In 1994–95, Shaw appeared in only two games with the Senators, getting no points. He finished the year with the Atlanta Knights of the IHL, where in 26 games, he had a goal and 19 points.  In five playoff games with Atlanta, Shaw had seven points.

After the season, Shaw signed with the Detroit Vipers of the IHL.

Detroit Vipers
Shaw joined the Detroit Vipers of the IHL as a player and an assistant coach to head coach Rick Dudley.  In his first season with the club in 1995–96, Shaw had seven goals and 61 points in 79 games. In eight playoff games, Shaw had two goals and five points, as Detroit lost to the Orlando Solar Bears.

Shaw returned as a player-assistant coach with the Vipers in 1996–97, as Steve Ludzik was named head coach of the team. In 59 games, Shaw had six goals and 38 points, finishing second in team defense in scoring. In 21 playoff games, Shaw had two goals and 11 points as the Vipers defeated the Long Beach Ice Dogs to win the Turner Cup.

Shaw was no longer an assistant coach in 1997–98, and played in 64 games, scoring two goals and 35 points. In the playoffs, Shaw had a goal and 12 points in 23 games, as the Vipers lost to the Chicago Wolves in seven games in the Turner Cup final.

In 1998–99, Shaw began the season with the Vipers, where he scored 10 goals and 45 points in 61 games.

On March 8, 1999, Shaw left the Vipers, as he signed an NHL contract with the Ottawa Senators.  Shaw had to pass through waivers, and was claimed by the Washington Capitals two days later.

Washington Capitals
Shaw returned to the NHL with the Washington Capitals in 1998–99, appearing in four games with the club, recording no points. His stay with the Capitals was short, as on March 18, 1999, Shaw and the Capitals' eighth round draft pick in the 1999 NHL Entry Draft were traded to the St. Louis Blues for the Blues sixth round draft pick in the 1999 NHL Entry Draft.

St. Louis Blues
Shaw finished the 1998-99 NHL season with the St. Louis Blues, earning no points in 12 games. Shaw saw action in four playoff games, going pointless, as the Blues lost to the Dallas Stars in the second round.

Shaw announced his retirement from playing hockey following the season.

Coaching career

Tampa Bay Lightning
Shaw was named an assistant coach of the Tampa Bay Lightning for the 1999-2000 season, working under head coach Steve Ludzik. The rebuilding club struggled to a 19-47–9–7 record, missing the playoffs. Shaw resigned from the position after only one season.

Detroit Vipers
Shaw joined the Detroit Vipers of the IHL as head coach of the team for the 2000-01 season. In his only season with the team, Detroit struggled to a 23–53–6 record, missing the playoffs. The league folded after the season.

Springfield Falcons
Shaw joined the Springfield Falcons of the AHL as an assistant coach, working under head coach Marc Potvin. Former Ottawa Senators teammate Norm Maciver was also an assistant coach. In his only season with the club, Springfield missed the playoffs with a 35–41–2–2 record.

Cincinnati Mighty Ducks
Shaw was named head coach of the Cincinnati Mighty Ducks of the AHL for the 2002–03 season, replacing Mike Babcock, who was promoted to the Mighty Ducks of Anaheim. In his first season with the Mighty Ducks, the club struggled to a 26–35–13–6 record, failing to make the post-season.

Shaw returned to the team for the 2003-04 season, as Cincinnati struggled to a 29–37–13–1 record. The Mighty Ducks defeated the Houston Aeros in the qualifying round, defeating the Aeros two games to none, to earn a playoff berth. In the first round of the Calder Cup playoffs, the Mighty Ducks nearly defeated the heavily-favoured Milwaukee Admirals, as they held a 3–2 series lead before losing the final two games to be eliminated.

Cincinnati improved during the 2004–05 season, as the team finished the season with a 44–31–1-4 record, making the playoffs. In the post-season, the Mighty Ducks got their revenge against the Milwaukee Admirals, defeating them in the first round. The Mighty Ducks lost to the Chicago Wolves in the second round.

New York Islanders
Shaw joined the New York Islanders of the NHL as an assistant coach under Steve Stirling for the 2005–06 season. After the Islanders struggled to an 18–22–2 record to start the season, the club fired Stirling, and named Shaw his replacement for the remainder of the season. Shaw won his first career game as a head coach, as the Islanders defeated the Calgary Flames 3–2 on January 12, 2006. Under Shaw, the Islanders posted an 18–18–4 record, and failed to qualify for the post-season. Shaw was relieved of his duties after the season.

St. Louis Blues
Shaw joined the St. Louis Blues in 2006–07 as an assistant coach under Mike Kitchen. Kitchen was replaced shortly into the season by Andy Murray, however, Shaw remained with the team. Shaw remained with St. Louis for 10 years, as an assistant coach under Andy Murray, Davis Payne and Ken Hitchcock.

Columbus Blue Jackets
Shaw joined John Tortorella's staff with the Columbus Blue Jackets in June 2016, replacing Craig Hartsburg, who retired following the 2015-16 season.

Vancouver Canucks
Shaw was announced as an assistant coach of the Vancouver Canucks in June 2021, replacing Newell Brown.

Philadelphia Flyers 
Shaw was named an associate coach of the Philadelphia Flyers in July 2022, re-uniting with John Tortorella.

Personal
Shaw's wife, Mary, is an author, and writer of the popular children's book series Brady Brady, named after their son, Brady, who also plays hockey.

Career statistics

Regular season and playoffs

International

NHL coaching record

References

External links

Profile at hockeydraftcentral.com

1964 births
Atlanta Knights players
Binghamton Whalers players
Canadian ice hockey coaches
Canadian ice hockey defencemen
Cincinnati Mighty Ducks coaches
Columbus Blue Jackets coaches
Detroit Red Wings draft picks
Detroit Vipers players
Hartford Whalers players
HC Varese players
Ice hockey people from Ontario
Living people
New York Islanders coaches
Ottawa 67's players
Ottawa Senators players
Philadelphia Flyers coaches
Salt Lake Golden Eagles (IHL) players
St. Louis Blues coaches
St. Louis Blues players
Sportspeople from Cambridge, Ontario
Springfield Falcons coaches
Springfield Falcons players
Tampa Bay Lightning coaches
Vancouver Canucks coaches
Washington Capitals players